Chris Roycroft-Davis (born 13 August 1948) is a journalist working in the United Kingdom. He was chief leader writer of The Sun.

Career

In 1994 he became chief leader writer of The Sun, writing the paper's editorial column The Sun Says six days a week. Roycroft-Davis left The Sun in 2005 to become a professional speaker, media coach, writer and broadcaster.

He worked as a speech and article writer for David Cameron and currently writes political commentaries for the Daily Express and contributes to the comment pages of The Times. He broadcasts regularly on Michael Parkinson's Sunday show on BBC Radio 2. His book, How to be King of the Media Jungle, was published in October 2007.

Controversy 
On 12th Oct. 2016 Roycroft-Davis wrote a controversial article for the Daily Express arguing that Members of Parliament should be imprisoned for asking for a vote on the terms of Britain leaving the European Union. The article generated concern about issues of freedom of speech, violence and Parliamentary sovereignty.

References

1948 births
Living people
English male journalists
People from Biggleswade